Athletes from the Netherlands competed at the 1924 Summer Olympics in Paris, France. 177 competitors, 168 men and 9 women, took part in 81 events in 17 sports.

Medalists

Athletics

Nineteen athletes represented the Netherlands in 1924. It was the nation's fourth appearance in the sport. The 4x100 metre relay team won the nation's first Olympic athletics medal, a bronze. That team had also matched the world record in the event in the quarterfinal heats, though teams in later quarterfinals and the semifinals bettered the record.

Ranks given are within the heat.

Boxing 

Nine boxers represented the Netherlands at the 1924 Games. It was the nation's second appearance in the sport. De Best's bye in the round of 16 and quarterfinal win made him the first Dutch boxer to reach the semifinals; he lost his semifinal and bronze medal bouts to take fourth place.

Cycling

Ten cyclists represented the Netherlands in 1924. It was the nation's third appearance in the sport. The Dutch cyclists won three medals, one of each color and one in each of three different events.

Willems won the 50 kilometre title, aided by a well-planned and well-executed early attack by Maas. Peeters, the defending sprint champion, was unable to advance to the semifinals; Meijer was nearly able to take the title himself, finishing second in the final to win silver. Peeters did win a medal, however, taking the tandem bronze along with Bosch.

Road cycling

Track cycling

Ranks given are within the heat.

Diving

Four divers, two men and two women, represented the Netherlands in 1924. It was the nation's debut in the sport.

Ranks given are within the heat.

 Men

 Women

Equestrian

Five equestrians represented the Netherlands in 1924. It was the nation's second appearance in the sport. The Dutch riders won both the individual and team eventing gold medals, with Adolf van der Voort van Zijp taking the individual honor. They were the first Olympic equestrian medals won by the Netherlands.

Fencing

17 fencers, 14 men and 3 women, represented the Netherlands in 1924. It was the nation's fifth appearance in the sport as well as the Games; the Netherlands was one of nine nations to send women to the first Olympic women's fencing competition. For the third straight Games, the Dutch sabre team took bronze.

 Men

Ranks given are within the pool.

 Women

Ranks given are within the pool.

Football

The Netherlands competed in the Olympic football tournament for the fourth time in 1924. The three-time defending bronze medalists once again reached the bronze medal game; this time, however, they lost.

 Round 1 Bye

 Round 2

 Quarterfinals

 Semifinals

 Bronze medal match

Final rank 4th place

Modern pentathlon

Four pentathletes represented the Netherlands in 1924. It was the nation's second appearance in the sport.

Rowing

17 rowers represented the Netherlands in 1924. It was the nation's fourth appearance in the sport. Dutch rowers won their first Olympic championship since 1900.

Ranks given are within the heat.

Sailing

Four sailors represented the Netherlands in 1924. It was the nation's third appearance in the sport.

Shooting

Eleven shooters represented the Netherlands in 1924. It was the nation's fifth appearance in the sport.

Swimming

Ranks given are within the heat.

 Men

 Women

Tennis

 Men

 Women

 Mixed

Water polo

The Netherlands made its third Olympic water polo appearance.

Roster
 Gé Bohlander
 Willy Bohlander
 Willem Bokhoven
 Jan den Boer
 A. Goedings
 Sjaak Köhler
 Abraham van Olst
 Karel Struijs
 Han van Senus
 Pieter van Senus
 R. van Senus

First round

Quarterfinals

 Silver medal semifinals

Bronze medal semifinals

Weightlifting

Wrestling

Greco-Roman

 Men's

Art Competitions

References

External links

Official Olympic Reports
International Olympic Committee results database

Nations at the 1924 Summer Olympics
1924
Olympics